The Black Hammock Wilderness Area is a  joint purchase between Seminole County, Florida and the St. Johns River Water Management District. It was acquired as part of a comprehensive effort to preserve significant habitat along the shores of Lake Jesup. This particular area also helps protect important recharge areas for the Geneva Bubble (local aquifer). Additionally, the wetland habitats of this property filter water on its way to Lake Jesup

Wildlife observed in the wilderness area includes the barred owl, white-tailed deer, bobcat and eastern hognose snake. The includes a boardwalk and trail system designed for local equestrians, mountain bikers, hikers, photographers and other outdoor enthusiasts.

The main parking area for the Black Hammock Wilderness Area is on CR 426, at the Barr Street entrance of the Little Big Econ State Forest in Geneva, Florida.

See also
Little Big Econ State Forest
St. Johns River Water Management District
Geneva, Florida

References

External links
Official Website
Management Plan (2010)

This article incorporates public domain material from websites or documents of the government of Seminole County, Florida.

Protected areas of Seminole County, Florida
Wilderness areas of Florida